Shorea sagittata (called, along with some other species in the genus Shorea, light red meranti) is a species of plant in the family Dipterocarpaceae. It is a tree endemic to Borneo.

References

sagittata
Endemic flora of Borneo
Trees of Borneo
Taxonomy articles created by Polbot